Aslim Taslam is a phrase meaning "submit (to God, i.e., by accepting Islam) and you will get salvation", taken from the letters sent by the Islamic prophet Muhammad to various kings and rulers in which he urged them to convert to Islam.

Letters of Muhammad
Muhammad, according to the usually told Islamic historiography, sent ambassadors with such letters to Heraclius the emperor of Eastern Roman Empire, Chosroes II the emperor of Persia, the Negus of Ethiopia, Muqawqis the ruler of Egypt, Harith Gassani the governor of Syria and Munzir ibn Sawa the ruler of Bahrain.

Muhammad's Letter to the King of Oman, Jaifer, and his Brother Abd Al-Jalandi -

In the Name of Allah, the Most Beneficent, the Most Merciful:

From Muhammad bin ‘Abdullah to Jaifer and ‘Abd Al-Jalandi - Peace be upon him who follows true guidance; thereafter I invite both of you to the Call of Islam. Embrace Islam. Allah has sent me as a Prophet to all His creatures in order that I may instill fear of Allah in the hearts of His disobedient creatures so that there may be left no excuse for those who deny Allah. If you two accept Islam, you will remain in command of your country; but if you refuse my Call, then all your possessions are perishable. My horsemen will appropriate your land, and my Prophethood will assume control over your kingship.

The account as transmitted by Muslim historians of the letter to Heraclius reads as follows

Western Translation

Arabic original

Similar Letters of Leaders from Muslim countries

On September 17, 2006, in response to the Pope Benedict XVI Islam controversy, characterized by Gazan clerics as "the result of his hatred for Islam and not the result of ignorance." one of them, Sheikh Imad Hamato, called on the pope to "repent and ask for forgiveness" and said: "We want to use the words of the Prophet Muhammad and tell the pope: aslim taslam." 

In May 2006, Mahmoud Ahmadinejad, President of the Islamic Republic of Iran, sent a similar letter to former US President George W. Bush saying aslim taslam. 

Osama bin Laden sent a handful of such letters both to USA and Europe saying aslim taslam

Adam Gadahn, an American-born Muslim convert from Al Qaeda, sent a video to the American people and said aslim taslam.

Egyptian Cleric Hassan Abu Al-Ashbal issued a similar statement aslim taslam to President Barack Obama.

Hizb ut-Tahrir Indonesia spokesperson, Ismail Yusanto said to Nikolas van Dam, the Dutch ambassador for Indonesia that the Dutch government is responsible for the Fitna (film) of Geert Wilders  and said aslim taslam.

Critical responses
In response to the aslim taslam invitation to submit to God by Islam, the Italian author and journalist Oriana Fallaci asserted the rejoinder "lan astaslem"  meaning "I will never surrender/I will never submit/I will never be a Muslim". 
 Michelle Malkin has taken up this slogan as a response to the WTC terrorist attacks

See also
Dawah
WikiBook: Learn Arabic
Dictionary of Modern Written Arabic
Glossary of Islamic terms in Arabic

References

Arabic words and phrases
Islam and other religions
Life of Muhammad
Conversion to Islam
Islamic terminology